La Nouvelle Revue d'histoire was a bimonthly French history magazine that was published between 2002 and 2017.

History and profile
La Nouvelle Revue d'histoire was established in July 2002 by Dominique Venner. The magazine has a right-wing political stance. Venner served as one of the editors of the magazine until 21 May 2013 when he committed suicide inside the cathedral of Notre Dame de Paris.

Gilles Mancheron was the editor-in-chief of the magazine.

The last issue was released in 2017. The same year, the editing company was closed down.

References

External links
 

2002 establishments in France
2017 disestablishments in France
Bi-monthly magazines published in France
Defunct magazines published in France
French-language magazines
History magazines
Magazines established in 2002
Magazines disestablished in 2017
Magazines published in Paris